Robert Ker (August 14, 1824 – 11 or 12 February 1879) was the first Auditor General of the British colonies which later became and the Canadian province of British Columbia. 

A descendant of the Dukes of Roxburghe and cousin of Allan Ebenezer Ker, Robert was born in Dalkeith and educated in Scotland, and came to Vancouver Island in 1859. He was friendly with colonial governor Sir James Douglas and John Sebastian Helmcken. Ker was the auditor general of the first Colony of British Columbia and also acted as auditor general of the Colony of Vancouver Island. When the two colonies united in 1866, he continued in the position of auditor general.

Upon Canadian Confederation in 1867, he was appointed to the position of Dominion paymaster general. He died in Victoria, British Columbia of exposure during a snowstorm.

The Ker Memorial Wing of the Art Gallery of Greater Victoria is named in his honour.

In 2009 the Ker Family celebrated its 150th anniversary in British Columbia.

External links
Biography at the Dictionary of Canadian Biography Online

1824 births
1879 deaths
Scottish emigrants to pre-Confederation British Columbia
People from Dalkeith
Canadian auditors
Colony of Vancouver Island people
Colony of British Columbia (1858–1866) people
Colony of British Columbia (1866–1871) people
Deaths from hypothermia